The Royal Orient is an Indian luxury tourism train that runs between Gujarat and Rajasthan, covering important tourist locations in the two states.

Modelled on the Palace on Wheels, India's first luxury tourist train, the train offers tourists a taste of royal luxury while "showcasing the best of Indian culture and heritage".

History
The train started in 1994-95 as a joint venture of the Tourism Corporation of Gujarat and the Indian Railways. The livery follows a blue scheme to differentiate it from the Palace on Wheels.

The train did not do well in the initial years, with passenger occupancy dropping from 25 percent in the first year to 15 percent in subsequent years. However, after an overhaul in 2007, things started looking up and the train started making profits.

Facilities
There are 13 coaches in the train, named after erstwhile kingdoms of Rajputana. The coaches provide five-star hotel comforts to passengers. Cabins are furnished in a palatial style and have spacious baths attached. There are multi-cuisine restaurants that offer Rajasthani, Gujarati, Indian, Chinese and Continental cuisine.

Route
The Royal Orient starts from Delhi Cantonment railway station and has stops at Chittorgarh, Jaipur, Udaipur, Amdavad, Mehsana, Junagarh, Veraval, Sasan Gir,  Mandvi, Palitana and Sarkhej.

Some of the tourist spots covered are the Qutub Minar, Red Fort and Jama Masjid in Delhi, Chittorgarh Fort and Rani Padmini's Palace in Chittorgarh, Sabarmati Ashram in Amdavad, Lake Palace in Udaipur, the Gir Wildlife Sanctuary and Somnath Temple in Gujarat and the Hawa Mahal and Jantar Mantar in Jaipur.

See also

Fairy Queen
Palace on Wheels
Deccan Odyssey
Mahaparinirvan Express
Golden Chariot
Royal Rajasthan on Wheels
Maharajas' Express

References

External links
 Royal Orient Train website
 Royal Orient Train page at Indian Railways website

Tourism in Rajasthan
Tourism in Gujarat
Luxury trains in India
Rail transport in Rajasthan
Rail transport in Gujarat
1994 establishments in Gujarat
1994 establishments in Rajasthan